This is a list of division results for the 2022 Australian federal election in the Australian Capital Territory and the Northern Territory.

This election was held using Instant-runoff voting. In this election, in the Australian Capital Territory (ACT) and the Northern Territory, there were no "turn-overs."  In each district, the candidate leading in the first count took the seat, either in the first count or in the end.

Australian Capital Territory

Overall results

Results by division

Bean

Canberra

Fenner

Northern Territory

Overall results

Results by division

Lingiari

Solomon

References

Notes

2022 Australian federal election
Territories 2022